Mankoff is a surname. Notable people with the surname include:

 Bob Mankoff (born 1944), American cartoonist, editor, and author
 Doug Mankoff (21st century), film producer
 Jennifer Mankoff (21st century), American computer scientist

See also
 Malkoff